St. George is a former provincial electoral division in Manitoba, Canada.

It was established for the 1914 provincial election, and eliminated with the 1981 election.

The constituency housed a large Icelandic population.  For most of its history, it was safe for the Liberal and Liberal-Progressive parties.

Provincial representatives

Former provincial electoral districts of Manitoba